Trichopilia fragrans is a species of orchid found from Caribbean to southern tropical America.

External links
 Photos

fragrans